Otha Foster III (born September 27, 1988) is an American professional gridiron football defensive back currently playing for the Saskatchewan Roughriders of the Canadian Football League. He played college football at West Alabama. He has been a member of the Kansas City Chiefs and Baltimore Ravens of the NFL, and the Toronto Argonauts, Edmonton Eskimos and BC Lions of the CFL.

College career
Foster played two years at Pearl River Community College during 2009 and 2010. He then transferred to the University of West Alabama where he completed his college career in 2011 and 2012, where his career record included 96 tackles, 16 pass deflections and 10 interceptions.

Professional career

Kansas City Chiefs
In May 2013, Foster signed with the Kansas City Chiefs of the NFL, as an undrafted free agent He played three preseason games with the Chiefs before being cut from the team.

Toronto Argonauts
He then moved to the Canadian Football League, signing with the Toronto Argonauts from whom he was acquired by the Edmonton Eskimos in 2014. He was traded to Edmonton from Toronto on May 13, 2014 along with Toronto's first and second round picks (6th and 15th overall) in the 2014 CFL Canadian Draft, import offensive lineman Tony Washington and a negotiation list player, in exchange for Edmonton's first and third round picks (3rd and 21st overall) in the 2014 CFL Canadian Draft and a negotiation list player.

Edmonton Eskimos 
After being traded to the Eskimos Foster became an immediate starter, and played in 16 games in the 2014 season. Foster recorded 46 defensive tackles, five special teams tackles, five pass knockdowns, one interception, one sack, one fumble recovery and one forced fumble. In the Labour Day Classic, Foster recovered a blocked punt by Willie Jefferson and scored a 57-yard touchdown. In the West Semi-final against Saskatchewan, Foster recorded one defensive tackle. In the West Final against Calgary, he recorded two defensive tackles. Foster continued his strong play in the 2015 season, contributing 57 tackles, 2 special teams tackles, 2 sacks, 1 interception, 1 forced fumble and 1 defensive touchdown.

Saskatchewan Roughriders 
On February 10, 2016, Foster signed as a free agent with the Saskatchewan Roughriders of the CFL. Foster had his best statistical season in 2016 playing in all 18 regular season games and racking up 71 tackles and 3 quarterback sacks. Set to become a free-agent in February 2017, Foster had a workout with the New Orleans Saints In December 2016. On January 20, 2017 Foster had a workout with the Baltimore Ravens. On January 27, 2017, a couple weeks before becoming a free agent, Foster was released by the Riders so he could pursue NFL opportunities.

Baltimore Ravens
On January 31, 2017, Foster signed a reserve/future contract with the Baltimore Ravens. He was waived on September 1, 2017 during final roster cutdowns.

Saskatchewan Roughriders
He signed with Saskatchewan in September 2017.

BC Lions
Foster signed with the BC Lions on February 14, 2018.

Personal life
Foster joined the United States Marine Corps in 2007 after he was redshirted at Southern University, attending basic training at Marine Corps Recruit Depot Parris Island and becoming a communications expert. He served in the Marines while playing football for two years at Pearl River Community College.

He is the father of two children, Olavia K. Foster, born on April 16, 2010. He is also the father of Otha Foster IV, born on Foster's Mother is Valerie Lee Foster Aikens. Foster's father, Otha Foster Jr., died January 9, 2010 after being a disabled dialysis patient for 19 years. Foster III was the main caregiver for his father since the age of eight. Even though Foster Jr. was on dialysis, he still managed to coach Foster III's little league football team. He lived to see him play JUCO, but he died at the age of 43, during Christmas break, before Foster III started at West Alabama.

References

External links
 BC Lions bio

Living people
1988 births
American football defensive backs
Canadian football defensive backs
American players of Canadian football
Pearl River Wildcats football players
People from Washington Parish, Louisiana
Players of American football from Louisiana
West Alabama Tigers football players
Toronto Argonauts players
Edmonton Elks players
Saskatchewan Roughriders players
Baltimore Ravens players
BC Lions players